The 2020 Men's European Water Polo Championship Qualifiers are a series of tournaments aimed to establish the participants of the 2020 Men's European Water Polo Championship. The matches were played from 11 to 13 October 2019.

Pools composition
The draw of the pools was held on 8 June 2019. The city selected as host were Tbilisi (Georgia), Nováky (Slovakia), Valletta (Malta) and  Utrecht (Netherlands). The best two teams of each group qualified for the European Championship main round.

Group A

Group B

Group C

Group D

Qualified teams

Teams already qualified through the 2018 European Championship:
 – Host nation
 – Winners of the 2018 European Championship
 – Runners-up of the 2018 European Championship
 – 3rd place at the 2018 European Championship
 – 4th place at the 2018 European Championship
 – 5th place at the 2018 European Championship
 – 6th place at the 2018 European Championship
 – 7th place at the 2018 European Championship

See also 
2020 Women's European Water Polo Championship Qualifiers

References

External links 
Official LEN website
Microplustiming.com (Official results website)

Men
Men's European Water Polo Championship
2019 in water polo